Sir Nicholas Dakin (born 10 July 1955) is a British Labour politician who served as the Member of Parliament (MP) for Scunthorpe from 2010 to 2019. He was the Shadow Minister for Schools from 2015 to 2016, Shadow Deputy Leader of the House of Commons in 2015, and an opposition whip from 2011 to 2015 and 2016 to 2019.

Early life

Dakin grew up in Leicestershire and attended school there before studying at the University of Hull and then King's College London, completing his undergraduate degree and then his PGCE respectively. He had previously trained as an accountant.

He taught English in Gävle, in eastern Sweden, and then at John Leggott College in Scunthorpe, where he became principal.

While teaching at John Leggott College, he was also a local councillor for Kingsway with Lincoln Gardens and then leader of North Lincolnshire Council from 1997–2003. He was also the deputy chair of Yorkshire Forward from 2005–2007.

Parliamentary career

He was selected in October 2009 to represent the Scunthorpe constituency and won the seat in May 2010 with a majority of 2,549. Subsequently, he won in 2015 and 2017. In 2017 he won with a 52% share of the vote.

Dakin has previously served on the Education Select Committee and was a member of the House of Common's Procedure Committee and the Speaker's Advisory Committee on Works of Art.

In October 2011 Dakin was appointed an Opposition Whip under Ed Miliband. He was then given the additional role of Shadow Deputy Leader of the House of Commons in May 2015. After Jeremy Corbyn won the leadership of the Labour Party in September 2015, Dakin was made Shadow Minister for Schools. Dakin resigned his Shadow Cabinet position in June 2016 citing loss of confidence in the Labour leader. He supported Owen Smith in the failed attempt to replace Jeremy Corbyn in the 2016 Labour Party (UK) leadership election.

In October 2016 Dakin re-joined the Opposition Whips' office.

Dakin was the chair of several All-Party Parliamentary Groups (APPGs) including: Steel and Metal Related Industries, Pancreatic Cancer, Education, Skills and Employment, and Bioethanol until his election defeat.

He lost his seat to former Conservative North Lincolnshire Council Councillor Holly Mumby-Croft in the 2019 United Kingdom general election.

Dakin was knighted in the 2020 Birthday Honours for political service.   In December 2022 he was chosen to stand again as the Labour candidate for Scunthorpe in the next General Election, due within two years.

Personal life

He married Audrey Balsom in 1979 in Leicester. Dakin has two daughters and a son.

References

External links
 
 BBC Democracy Live

1955 births
Living people
Alumni of the University of Hull
Alumni of King's College London
Knights Bachelor
Labour Party (UK) MPs for English constituencies
UK MPs 2010–2015
UK MPs 2015–2017
UK MPs 2017–2019
Borough of North Lincolnshire
Politicians awarded knighthoods
People from the Borough of Charnwood
People from Scunthorpe
Councillors in the Borough of North Lincolnshire
Schoolteachers from Lincolnshire
Place of birth missing (living people)